A pro shop is a sporting-goods shop within a public or private-membership amateur sporting activities facility of some kind, most commonly a golf course, where it will typically be located in the country club building. In the case of golf pro shops, such stores usually provide equipment such as golf balls, clubs, shoes, and tees, as well as golf-themed gift items, and sometimes snacks or refreshments.

Aside from golf courses, pro shops are also frequently found at bowling alleys, pool and snooker halls, tennis and racquetball courts, ice and roller hockey rinks, and football (soccer) facilities. Some American football teams, such as the Green Bay Packers and New England Patriots, offer team merchandise and replica apparel for purchase through team stores branded as "pro shops", either at a store at the team's stadium, a separate shop located in another venue such as a shopping mall, or through an online shopping portal.

Pro shops are often managed by a house pro, a professional player, and overseen by a general manager  who is employed by or acts as a consultant contractor to the venue, though shops may instead be run by a retail manager at larger venues (or those too small to attract a pro). House pros are often available to advise on game-related issues such as rules details or the proper equipment for particular needs and conditions, and sometimes also for instruction such as group lessons or one-on-one training (usually for a fee). House pros sometimes also perform paid personal equipment maintenance, such as restringing tennis racquets, drilling and fitting bowling balls, re-tipping pool/snooker cues, skate sharpening, etc., depending upon the sport.

See also
Dive center, which fulfills pro shop functions for underwater diving

Sports business
Sporting goods industry
Sporting goods retailers
Golf instruction